The UAE was first granted T20I status in January 2014, by virtue of being granted One Day International (ODI) status. This was a result of their performance at the 2014 World Cup Qualifier, where they placed second to qualify for the 2015 World Cup. The team had made its ODI debut as early as 1994, against India, but received ODI status on a non-temporary basis only in 2014. The UAE's first full Twenty20 Internationals came at the 2014 World Twenty20 in Bangladesh, where the team played against the Netherlands, Ireland, and Zimbabwe. The team played further T20Is at the 2015 World Twenty20 Qualifier, but failed to qualify for the 2016 World Twenty20 tournament.

This list comprises all members of the UAE cricket team who have played at least one T20I match. It is initially arranged in the order in which each player won his first Twenty20 cap. Where more than one player won his first Twenty20 cap in the same match, those players are listed alphabetically by surname.

Key

List of players

Last updated 19 February 2023.

See also
Twenty20 International
United Arab Emirates cricket team
List of United Arab Emirates ODI cricketers
United Arab Emirati national cricket captains

Notes

References 

United Arab Emirates

T20I
United Arab Emirates in international cricket
Cricketers, T20I